Amnirana occidentalis is a species of frog in the family Ranidae. It is found in Ivory Coast, Ghana, Guinea, Liberia, and possibly Nigeria. Its natural habitats are subtropical or tropical moist lowland forests, freshwater marshes, and intermittent freshwater marshes. It is threatened by habitat loss.

References

occidentalis
Amphibians described in 1960
Taxonomy articles created by Polbot